Edilson Borba de Aquino (born 24 May 1995), commonly known as Orinho, is a Brazilian footballer who plays as a left back for Belarusian Premier League club Dinamo Minsk.

Club career

Juventus
Born in São Paulo, Orinho joined Juventus-SP in 2013, from Grêmio Osasco. He made his senior debut for the former on 19 July 2014, coming on as a second-half substitute in a 0–0 Copa Paulista away draw against Santo André.

After impressing with the youth sides, Orinho was promoted to the main squad before the start of the 2015 Campeonato Paulista Série A3. He featured regularly during the tournament, scoring his first senior goal on 18 March through a direct free kick in a 2–0 home win against Cotia FC.

Santos
On 16 July 2015, Orinho joined Santos on a one-year loan deal, being initially assigned to the under-20 squad. The following year, he was promoted to the reserve side, and was bought outright on 3 June 2016, signing a permanent three-year contract.

In July 2017, after the departure of Caju and the injury of Zeca, Orinho was promoted to the main squad by manager Levir Culpi. He made his first team – and Série A – debut on 16 September, starting in a 2–0 away loss against Botafogo.

On 15 January 2018, Orinho was loaned to Ponte Preta until the end of the year. Upon returning, he became the only effective in the left back position and started the campaign as a first-choice under new manager Jorge Sampaoli, but lost his starting spot after the arrival of Felipe Jonatan.

Fluminense
On 18 September 2019, Orinho joined Fluminense until the end of 2020.

Career statistics

References

External links
Santos FC profile 

1995 births
Living people
Footballers from São Paulo
Brazilian footballers
Association football defenders
Campeonato Brasileiro Série A players
Campeonato Brasileiro Série B players
Clube Atlético Juventus players
Santos FC players
Associação Atlética Ponte Preta players
Fluminense FC players
Oeste Futebol Clube players
FC Dinamo Minsk players
Brazilian expatriate footballers
Expatriate footballers in Belarus